Florin Andone (born 11 April 1993) is a Romanian professional footballer who plays as a striker for Spanish Segunda División side UD Las Palmas.

Raised in Spain since the age of 12, Andone began playing in the country's lower divisions before making his professional debut for Córdoba at the age of 21. In 2016, he joined Deportivo La Coruña, and two years later he signed for Brighton & Hove Albion in England. In 2022, Andone returned to Spain, signing with Las Palmas.

Andone earned his first full cap for Romania in June 2015 and was selected for UEFA Euro 2016.

Club career

Early years
Born in Botoșani, Andone moved to Vinaròs in the Valencian Community in 2005, aged 12, to join his mother after his father died in a car accident. He immediately joined Vinaròs CF's youth setup, and in 2008 moved to Castellón.

Andone made his senior debut on 16 January 2011, coming on as a late substitute for Pau Franch in a 1–1 away draw against Orihuela in the Segunda División B championship. He appeared in three further matches for the club, which eventually suffered relegation.

On 2 June 2011, Andone joined Villarreal, returning to youth football. He also appeared with the C-team during the campaign, with the side in Tercera División.

On 15 August 2013, Andone was loaned to the third level's Atlético Baleares, in a season-long deal. He finished the campaign with 12 goals in 34 matches, with the Balearic outfit being one point shy of the play-offs.

Córdoba
On 3 July 2014, Andone signed a three-year deal with Córdoba, being initially assigned to the reserves in the same division. On 29 November, he was promoted to the main squad by manager Miroslav Đukić.

Andone played his first match as a professional on 3 December 2014, replacing Xisco in the 57th minute of a 1–0 away loss against Granada, for the season's Copa del Rey. He scored his first goal on the second leg, netting his side's only in a 1–1 home draw.

In his La Liga debut on 5 January 2015 Andone was handed his first start, and scored to confirm a 2–0 home win against the same opponent. On 16 January, in a 1–1 home draw against Eibar, he scored the first after only ten seconds, being the Andalusians' fastest goal in the top level, and the fourth overall.

Following Córdoba's relegation, he was named the Segunda División Player of the Month for October 2015 with four goals, which put his team in the top position.

In January 2016, as Sevilla, Málaga, Southampton, Aston Villa and Steaua București showed interest in Andone, he renewed his contract with the Blanquiverdes until 2018, receiving a wage per year 10 times higher (and 20 if his club earn promotion), and with a release clause of €20 million, the highest such figure in the club's history.

On 3 April, he struck his first hat-trick in a 4–4 draw at Gimnàstic de Tarragona. He ended his season with 21 goals after scoring the game's only at Mallorca to achieve a play-off place on 29 May, missing the final round in order to join up with Romania; he was ultimately beaten to the division's Pichichi Trophy by Elche's Sergio León.

Deportivo La Coruña
On 22 July 2016, top-flight club Deportivo La Coruña transferred Andone for €4.7 million plus 30% from a potential future transfer fee; it was the team's biggest purchase in the last nine years. He was given the number 10 jersey and made his debut as a substitute on 19 August in a 2–1 home win against Eibar, scoring his first goal on 5 November to open a 1–1 draw at Granada. He was named La Liga Player of the Month for December after contributing with three goals and two assists, including a brace in a win over Real Sociedad.

Andone scored his eighth goal of the season in a 1–1 league draw with Atlético Madrid, on 2 March 2017. On 26 April, he netted one for himself and also set up another goal in a 6–2 home loss to Real Madrid.

In August 2017, Deportivo La Coruña turned down a €13 million offer for the player from Premier League side Burnley, with club president Tino Fernández stating that Andone would only leave if his €30 million release clause is activated. Brighton & Hove Albion was also interested in transferring him, and made a €20 million bid which was also supposedly rejected. He scored six goals and assisted three more in the 2017–18 season, which ended in relegation for the Galician team.

Brighton & Hove Albion

On 25 May 2018, Andone signed a five-year deal with Brighton & Hove Albion for an undisclosed fee, and joined the Premier League side when the international transfer window opened on 8 June. The rumoured transfer fee was €6 million, representing the release clause in his contract in case of Deportivo La Coruña's relegation.

Andone scored for Brighton in his fourth appearance—and also his first start—away against Huddersfield Town in a 2–1 comeback victory, and netted again in the next match at the Falmer Stadium against  rivals Crystal Palace, collecting the ball just inside the Palace half, dribbling into the area and scoring from an acute angle in a 3–1 victory.

On 5 January 2019, Andone scored on his FA Cup debut in a 3–1 away win against Bournemouth, and a month later he scored in a fourth round replay win against West Bromwich Albion. Before his goal, he elbowed opponent Sam Field's face without the officials seeing; he was later fined and banned for three matches.

On 24 August 2019, Andone was sent off in a Premier League match against Southampton, following a rash knee-high challenge on Yan Valery. Brighton manager Graham Potter described the tackle as "one we can't defend", and Paul Merson, speaking on Soccer Saturday, described it as worth "five red cards" and "one of the worst tackles you will ever see".

Galatasaray (loan)
After three league appearances, one goal and a red card for Brighton in August 2019, Andone agreed to a season-long loan with Turkish Süper Lig side Galatasaray on 2 September. Andone made his debut for the Turkish side on 20 September, starting in the eventual 1–1 away draw against Yeni Malatyaspor. Andone made his first start for the Süper Lig side on 5 October in a 0–0 away draw against Gençlerbirliği. He netted his first goals for Gala scoring a brace, one of which a penalty, in a 3–2 home victory over Sivasspor.

After suffering a MCL injury in November 2019 which ruled him out until the new year, he suffered a season-ending injury in a 2–0 away loss at Caykur Rizespor on 14 June: another MCL injury and ACL tears after colliding with opposition goalkeeper Tarık Çetin. He then returned to  Brighton. He left scoring 2 goals in 12 appearances in all competitions.

Return to Brighton
Andone returned to Brighton and was to recover from his injury where in January 2021, Potter said that "Florin is making good progress." On 15 May, he returned to the matchday squad for the first time for the 2020–21 season, remaining an unused substitute in the 1–1 home draw against West Ham United. In September 2022, Andone had the final 12 months of his contract, due to expire in 2024, mutually terminated.

Andone returned to Spain and its top tier on 23 August 2021, after agreeing to a one-year loan deal with Cádiz.

Las Palmas
On 1 September 2022, Andone signed a one-season deal with Segunda División side UD Las Palmas on the final day of the summer transfer window.

International career
Andone stated that his dream is to play for the Romania national team, despite living in Spain for most of his life. He was called up by manager Anghel Iordănescu for the UEFA Euro 2016 qualification match against the Faroe Islands in March 2015, but was an unused substitute in the 1–0 win. Andone made his full international debut in another qualifier on 13 June 2015, playing the last 18 minutes in a 0–0 away draw against Northern Ireland.

On 17 November 2015, Andone scored his first international goal, exploiting an error by Italian goalkeeper Salvatore Sirigu for a last-minute equaliser in a 2–2 draw in Bologna. He was selected for UEFA Euro 2016 in France, where he started against the hosts in the opening game after recovering from a hand injury, and made two more substitute appearances in a group-stage exit.

Andone scored his first goal in front of the home crowd, and only second overall, on 5 September 2019 in a 1–2 defeat to Spain in a Euro 2020 qualifier.

Style of play
Naturally right-footed, Andone plays as a striker and has been praised for his work ethic.

Career statistics

Club

International

Scores and results list Romania's goal tally first, score column indicates score after each Andone goal.

Honours
Individual
 Segunda División Player of the Month: October 2015
 Segunda División Best Forward (first part of the season): 2015–16
 La Liga Player of the Month: December 2016
 Deportivo La Coruña Player of the Season: 2016–17

References

External links

 

1993 births
Living people
Sportspeople from Botoșani
Romanian emigrants to Spain
Romanian footballers
Association football forwards
La Liga players
Segunda División players
Segunda División B players
Tercera División players
CD Castellón footballers
Villarreal CF B players
CD Atlético Baleares footballers
Córdoba CF B players
Córdoba CF players
Deportivo de La Coruña players
Cádiz CF players
UD Las Palmas players
Brighton & Hove Albion F.C. players
Galatasaray S.K. footballers
Romania youth international footballers
Romania international footballers
Romanian expatriate footballers
Romanian expatriate sportspeople in Spain
Romanian expatriate sportspeople in England
Romanian expatriate sportspeople in Turkey
Expatriate footballers in Spain
Expatriate footballers in England
Expatriate footballers in Turkey
UEFA Euro 2016 players